Bettina Müller (born 24 July 1952) is an East German sprint canoer who competed in the early to mid-1970s. She won two medals in the K-4 500 m event at the ICF Canoe Sprint World Championships with a gold in 1975 and a bronze in 1971.

Müller also finished fifth in the K-1 500 m event at the 1972 Summer Olympics in Munich.

References

1952 births
Canoeists at the 1972 Summer Olympics
East German female canoeists
Living people
Olympic canoeists of East Germany
ICF Canoe Sprint World Championships medalists in kayak